The Esports Integrity Commission (ESIC), formerly the Esports Integrity Coalition, is a non-profit members' association established in 2016 to promote and facilitate competitive integrity in esports.

History 
The organization was founded by Ian Smith as the "Esports Integrity Coalition" in 2016 before rebranding in 2019. Smith had been an attorney working in sports regulation law before he was brought into the Global Offensive scene to investigate skin gambling. His recognition of the lack of regulatory bodies in the scene led to the founding of ESIC.

Services 
The commission works to investigate and prevent all forms of match fixing, cheating, and use of doping, most recently investigating the coaching bug in Counter-Strike: Global Offensive. The commission only employs five full-time workers and works by partnering with several betting websites and tournament organizers. The results of investigations are passed on to the organizers, who enforce the sanctions recommended by ESIC.

Criticism 
Although ESIC received plaudits for the CS:GO coaching bug investigation, the organization has also been criticized for a perceived lack of expertise about the games it regulates. According to The Washington Post, unnamed critics have described the organization as "underfunded". ESIC doing its work mostly hidden from the public has also caused "public speculation [to curdle] into skepticism".

ESIC was criticized in December 2022 by the CS:GO community when it lifted Nicolai "HUNDEN" Petersen's two-year ban early after a "constructive engagement between the two parties". HUNDEN was banned by ESIC in August 2021 after he leaked the strategy folder of Heroic, the team he was coaching, to other teams during IEM Cologne 2021.

References 

Esports organizations
Cheating in esports